Capnolymma ishiharai is a species of beetle in the family Cerambycidae. It was described by Ohbayashi in 1994.

References

Beetles described in 1994
Lepturinae